The 1995 Akron Zips football team represented Akron University in the 1995 NCAA Division I-A football season as members of the Mid-American Conference. They were led by first-year head coach Lee Owens. The Zips played their home games at the Rubber Bowl in Akron, Ohio. They finished the season with a record of 2–9 overall and 2–6 in MAC play to tie for seventh place.

This season was the last year of the Steel Tire rivalry series between Akron and Youngstown State, who'd met every year since 1967. The two teams are scheduled to meet next on September 5, 2020.

Schedule

References

Akron
Akron Zips football seasons
Akron Zips football